Jesús Lara may refer to:
 Jesús Alberto Lara (born 1994), Mexican footballer
 Jesús Lara Lara (1898–1980), Bolivian writer